Paul Connaughton may refer to:

Paul Connaughton Snr (born 1944), Irish Fine Gael politician for Galway East from 1981–2011
His son Paul Connaughton Jnr, Irish Fine Gael politician for Galway East since 2011